Decatur High School is an American secondary school teaching grades nine through twelve.  A part of the Federal Way Public Schools, it was founded in 1971 in Federal Way, Washington.The graduating classes of 1973-1976 were schooled in the Illahee Middle School building.  The school was built in 1976, renovated in 1987, then again remodeled in 2002.

Although sometimes assumed to have been named after Commodore Stephen Decatur, a War of 1812 and the First Barbary War and the Second Barbary War naval hero, the school is in fact named after the USS Decatur, a ship named for Stephen Decatur that assisted settlers during the 1856 Battle of Seattle.

Decatur was originally built as an "open concept" high school, where students were encouraged to study at their own pace in an open environment. Within the framework of this concept, there were few permanent walls built in the school's original structure. However, this experimental approach was scrapped after the 1976-77 school year when it was discovered that not all high school students were self-motivated enough to meet the district's education standards.

Athletics
Decatur is part of the Olympic Division of the 4A North Puget Sound League in Washington's West Central District.
From 2008-09 to 2015-16, Decatur was part of the South Division of the 3A South Puget Sound League.
Recent team finishes in State Championships include:
1st in '01 and '02 in boys' soccer, at one point the team was ranked 7th('01) and 2nd('02) in the entire nation. 1989 3rd in state boys' soccer.
Dance/ Drill Team 2014 State Champions, 2015 Contest of Champions National Champions, 2015 4A double State Champions 2013 USA NATIONAL CHAMPIONS (Kick, Small Military, and Medium Military),2012 USA NATIONAL CHAMPIONS (kick),1st in '13 (Military),2nd in '07, '11, and '12 (military), 3rd in '06 and '09 (military), 4th in '05, '08, '10(military), and 1st in  '10 (POM), 2nd in '13 (Pom), 2nd in '11(kick) and 3rd in '11(pom), 1st in '12,'13 (kick) for the Dance/Drill Team
5th in State Girls' Basketball
1st in 2003 and '05, 3rd in '04, 4th in '02, and 7th in '01 and '06 for Boys' Swim and Dive
2nd in '04, 3rd in '05, and 4th in '00 for Boys' Tennis
2nd in 1996 for Boys' Basketball
3rd in '00 for Girls' Tennis
1st in '10 for Girls' Tennis
3rd in '04 for Girls' Track and Field
4th in '05, 5th in '00, and 7th in '06 for Girls' Swim and Dive
1st in '04,‘11 and 2nd in '17 for Cheerleading
1st in '12 for fastest wrestling tournament, Joe Smith (Tacoma) 34 second pin, Zach Sexton (Cascade) 24 second pin,  Gary Harbrough (Mukilteo) 46.3 second pin.
Semi Finals in '08 for Boys' Basketball lost to Federal Way High School
Other sports are Football, Baseball, Basketball, Cross Country, Gymnastics, Fastpitch Softball, Volleyball, Soccer, Wrestling and Golf.

Decatur's main rivals are the Federal Way Eagles and the Thomas Jefferson Raiders

Notable alumni
 Roberto Bergersen, former professional basketball player
 Rich Cho, basketball executive
 Benson Henderson, professional Mixed Martial Artist, former WEC and UFC Lightweight Champion. Currently competing with Bellator MMA.
 Ciaran O'Brien, professional soccer player
 Apolo Ohno, 8 time Olympic medalist
 Bill Radke, host of Seattle's KUOW-FM's The Record and Week In Review
 Jason Stiles, American football player
 John McMullen, national talk show host and program director at Sirius Satellite Radio

References

Decatur School Profile

External links

South Puget Sound League: Decatur High School
Decatur Boys' Basketball Website

Decatur, Stephen High School
Decatur, Stephen High School
D
Federal Way, Washington
Public high schools in Washington (state)
1973 establishments in Washington (state)